1700 Pacific is a skyscraper located at 1700 Pacific Avenue in the City Center District of Dallas, Texas. The building rises  and contains 49 floors of office space. It is currently the seventh tallest building in the city and was the second tallest in the city when it was completed in 1983, trailing only Renaissance Tower.

The land on which 1700 Pacific sits was once two triangular blocks separated by Live Oak Street. In 1977, one of the triangular blocks was purchased by Dallas Transit Board for a major transit interchange on a proposed underground transit system

The architect for the Tower was WZMH Architects. Berkeley First City L.P. first owned the building while Jones Lang LaSalle leased the building. Now, the current owner is Olymbec, who also manages the leasing. Olymbec is responsible for renovations throughout the building in 2016.

In 2008, Jones Lang LaSalle announced that a  fitness center named "Elevation" would move into 1700 Pacific.

See also
 List of tallest buildings in Dallas

References

External links
 1700 Pacific official website
 
 1700 Pacific at Skyscraper Center

Skyscraper office buildings in Dallas
Office buildings completed in 1983
WZMH Architects buildings